The 1940 New Hampshire earthquakes struck on December 20 and again on December 24. Both shocks had an estimated  magnitude of 5.6, and a maximum Mercalli intensity of VII (Very strong). These doublet earthquakes were the largest to hit the state in several hundred years. Damage included minor fractures or knocked over chimneys in a zone extending through New Hampshire and four other states: Maine, New York, Vermont and Massachusetts.

History 
While not known for earthquakes, New Hampshire has been dotted with both major and minor events. Two examples of strong earthquakes occurred in the 17th century.  One was the 1638 earthquake; the other significant event to strike the state was the 1663 Charlevoix earthquake, originating in the Saint Lawrence River fault zone. The extent of the earthquake is not firm, at least in the state, as the population was composed largely of colonial settlers who had left the east coast. The 1663 earthquake felled chimneys, oscillated houses, and threw pewter from shelves in the Massachusetts Bay area.

Geography 
Reports of the 1940 earthquake extended as far north as Montreal and Quebec in Canada, and included Maine, New York, New Jersey, Pennsylvania, northeastern Delaware, Massachusetts, Vermont and Rhode Island. The epicenter was next to the Ossipee Mountains, near the town of Ossipee, New Hampshire. These mountains are the remains of an ancient volcanic ring dike. A similar ring dike can be seen in southern New Hampshire at Pawtuckaway State Park.

Damage 
Both earthquakes had surface magnitudes estimated at 5.5 and a Mercalli intensity of VII, and spawned waves of minor damage. There were reports of fractured pipes, walls, and furniture, as well as "fallen plaster" near the epicenter. The number of chimneys damaged totaled 20, in addition to fallen ones. The earthquake additionally shifted objects as heavy as stoves. Aftershocks of the earthquake occurred over the next several months.

See also
 List of earthquakes in 1940
 List of earthquakes in the United States

Notes

Sources 

 .
 .
 .
 
 .
 , 310p.

External links 
 Quakes in east bigger puzzle than those on west coast – The New York Times

New Hampshire Earthquake, 1940
New Hampshire Earthquake, 1940
Earthquakes in New Hampshire
History of New Hampshire
New Hampshire earthquake